Hugh Hughes may refer to:

Sports
Hugh Hesketh Hughes (1902–1940), Welsh polo player
Hugh Hughes (rugby union), Wales international rugby union player

Others
Henry Castree Hughes (1893–1976), British architect, known as Hugh Hughes
Hugh Iorys Hughes (1902–1977), British civil engineer
Hugh Hughes (painter) (1790?–1863), Welsh artist, engraver and writer
Hugh Hughes (poet) (y Bardd Coch) (1693–1776), Welsh poet
Hugh Hughes (Tegai) (1805–1864), Welsh minister and poet
Hugh Llewellyn Glyn Hughes (1892–1973), British brigadier, known for liberating Bergen-Belsen concentration camp
Hugh Hughes (MP) (died 1609), Welsh politician
Hugh Price Hughes (1847–1902), Welsh Christian theologian in the Methodist tradition
Hugh Hughes (trade unionist) (1878–1932), trade unionist in Wales
Hugh Hughes (One Life to Live), a fictional character from the ABC soap opera One Life to Live